Dariusz Formella (born 21 October 1995) is a Polish professional footballer who plays as a striker or left winger for Oakland Roots SC in the USL Championship.

Club career

On 1 February 2016 he was loaned to Arka Gdynia for a half-year deal.

On 20 July 2017 he was loaned to Pogoń Szczecin. On 25 January 2018 he was loaned to I liga side Raków Częstochowa.

Formella played a half year on loan at Raków Częstochowa, before he joined the club permanently in the summer 2018. His contract was terminated by mutual consent on 8 May 2019.

Sacramento Republic FC 
On 18 July 2019, Formella signed to Sacramento Republic FC of the USL Championship for the remainder of the 2019 season with a club option for 2020.

Career statistics

Club

1 Including Polish SuperCup.

Honours

Lech Poznań
 Ekstraklasa: 2014–15
 Polish Super Cup: 2015, 2016

Arka Gdynia
 Polish Cup: 2016–17

References

External links
 
 

Living people
1995 births
Polish footballers
Poland youth international footballers
Poland under-21 international footballers
Association football forwards
Arka Gdynia players
Lech Poznań players
Lech Poznań II players
Pogoń Szczecin players
Raków Częstochowa players
Sacramento Republic FC players
Oakland Roots SC players
USL Championship players
Ekstraklasa players
I liga players
III liga players
Polish expatriate footballers
Polish expatriate sportspeople in the United States
Expatriate soccer players in the United States
Sportspeople from Gdynia